The Education Act 1996 is Act of the Parliament of the United Kingdom. It led to the establishment of special local authorities, who for example would identify children with special educational needs.

References

External links
Education Act 1996

1996 in education
United Kingdom Acts of Parliament 1996
United Kingdom Education Acts
July 1996 events in the United Kingdom